John Hegarty may refer to:

John Hegarty (academic), Provost of Trinity College
John Hegarty (Gaelic footballer), player for Wexford
John Hegarty (rugby union) (1925–2016), Scottish rugby union footballer
John Hegarty (politician) (born 1947), Australian politician
John Hegarty (advertising executive) (born 1944)
Jack Hegarty (1888–1974), American football player

See also
 John Hawkins Hagarty (1816–1900), Canadian lawyer, teacher and judge
John Haggerty (disambiguation)